Leechia sinuosalis is a moth in the family Crambidae. It was described by South in 1901. It is found in China (Shaanxi, Gansu, Anhui, Hubei, Jiangxi, Hunan, Fujian, Guangdong, Sichuan), Japan and Taiwan.

References

Moths described in 1901
Schoenobiinae